Ona is an unincorporated community and census-designated place in Hardee County, Florida, United States. Its population was 199 as of the 2020 census. Ona has a post office with ZIP code 33865, which opened on October 11, 1897. State Road 64 and a CSX Transportation line pass through the community.

Demographics

References

Unincorporated communities in Hardee County, Florida
Census-designated places in Florida
Unincorporated communities in Florida
Former municipalities in Florida
Census-designated places in Hardee County, Florida